Wei Wei (born 6 October 1989 in Taigu County, Shanxi) is a basketball player for the China women's national basketball team. She was part of the squad for the 2012 Summer Olympics.

References

External links

1989 births
Living people
Chinese women's basketball players
Basketball players at the 2012 Summer Olympics
Olympic basketball players of China
Basketball players from Shanxi
People from Jinzhong
Shanxi Flame players
Guangdong Vermilion Birds players